William Forsyth QC (25 October 1812 – 26 December 1899) was a Scottish lawyer and Conservative Member of Parliament (MP).

Early life and education
He was born at Greenock in Renfrewshire, son of merchant Thomas Forsyth, of Birkenhead, and Jane Campbell, daughter of John Hamilton, of Deer Park, near Greenock, from a landed gentry family of Scottish origin that had settled at Wilton, Herefordshire. His brother was the diplomat Sir Douglas Forsyth.

He was educated at Sherborne School and Trinity College, Cambridge, where he graduated B.A. in 1834. He was admitted at the Inner Temple in 1834 and called to the Bar in 1839.

Career
He became a Bencher of the Inner Temple in 1857, Queen's Counsel in 1857 and Treasurer in 1872. He worked on the Midland Circuit. He was Standing Counsel to  Secretary of State for India 1859 to 1874. He was elected as MP for Cambridge at the 1865 general election but was unseated in April 1866, being disqualified as holding an office of profit under the Crown.  He was later MP for Marylebone from 1874 to 1880.

He wrote a number of books on historical and legal subjects, including History of Trial By Jury (1852), Life of Cicero (1864), The Novels and Novelists of the Eighteenth Century (1871) and Hannibal in Italy (1872).  He was also editor of several magazines.  Forsyth was a member of the Canterbury Association from 1 May 1848 to 22 April 1850, when he resigned.  In 1849, the chief surveyor of the Canterbury Association, Joseph Thomas, named Lake Forsyth for him.  

He died at Knightsbridge, Middlesex, and was buried in Brookwood Cemetery in Surrey. His will probated at £18,667 in 1899.

Family

Forsyth was married twice. He was firstly married to Mary Lyall (daughter of George Lyall and Margaret Ann Edwards) (1819–1864), in 1843, by whom he had six children (two sons and four daughters).  He remarried to Georgina Plummer in 1866; they also had children.
His descendants and spouses of descendants include Doreen Knatchbull, Baroness Brabourne, James Stanhope, 7th Earl Stanhope and John Hamilton Wedgwood.

References

External links

 

1812 births
1899 deaths
Conservative Party (UK) MPs for English constituencies
UK MPs 1865–1868
UK MPs 1874–1880
Scottish lawyers
Politics of the City of Westminster
People from Greenock
People educated at Sherborne School
Alumni of Trinity College, Cambridge
Members of the Inner Temple
19th-century King's Counsel
Members of the Canterbury Association
Burials at Brookwood Cemetery